Las Tablas Protected Zone, is a protected area in Costa Rica, managed under the Pacific La Amistad Conservation Area, it was created in 1981 by law 6638.

References 

Nature reserves in Costa Rica
Protected areas established in 1981